Stadio Dino Liotta is an arena in Licata, Italy.  It is primarily used for football, and is the home to the Licata Calcio 1931 of the Serie D. It opened in 1988 and holds 9,000 spectators.

References

Football venues in Italy
Licata